Nick Sullivan may refer to:
 Nick Sullivan (soccer) (born 1998), Australian soccer player
 Nick Sullivan (luger) (born 1979), American luger
 Nick Sullivan (Neighbours)